Dan Knott Junior High is a junior high school in Edmonton, Alberta, Canada, located in the Knottwood community. 

In 2006, Today's Parent named the school one of the top 40 elementary and junior high schools in Canada.

Name 
Dan Knott School is named after former Edmonton mayor Dan Knott. In 2017, Edmonton Public Schools promised to debate changing the school's name due to Dan Knott's association with the Alberta branch of the Ku Klux Klan. 

In early September 2020, after a petition was put forward by a community member, the school board voted unanimously in favour of a motion that "recommended the school division seek input from the community" before renaming the school. In May 2022, it was announced that the school would be renamed to kisêwâtisiwin, a Cree term meaning kindness or the act of being kind. The new name will take effect at the beginning of the 2022–23 school year.

Athletics
Dan Knott is also well known for its athletics program. The following teams were, or have been active at Dan Knott:
Sr. Boys & Sr. Girls Volleyball
Wrestling
Boys & Girls Soccer
 Sr. and Jr. Badminton
Jr. Boys & Jr. Girls Volleyball
Sr. Boys & Jr. Boys Basketball
Sr. Girls & Jr. Girls Basketball
 Track Team
Flag Rugby
Cheer

 Swimming
 flag football

References

External links 
 Dan Knott Jr. High School

Middle schools in Edmonton
Educational institutions in Canada with year of establishment missing